Legionella pneumophila is a thin, aerobic, pleomorphic, flagellated, non-spore-forming, Gram-negative bacterium of the genus Legionella. L. pneumophila is the primary human pathogenic bacterium in this group and is the causative agent of Legionnaires' disease, also known as legionellosis.

In nature, L. pneumophila infects freshwater and soil amoebae of the genera Acanthamoeba and Naegleria. The mechanism of infection is similar in amoeba and human cells.

Characterization
L. pneumophila is a Gram-negative, non-encapsulated, aerobic bacillus with a single, polar flagellum often characterized as being a coccobacillus. It is aerobic and unable to hydrolyse gelatin or produce urease. It is also non-fermentative. L. pneumophila is neither pigmented nor does it autofluoresce. It is oxidase- and catalase-positive, and produces beta-lactamase. L. pneumophila colony morphology is gray-white with a textured, cut-glass appearance; it also requires cysteine and iron to thrive. It grows on yeast extract agar in "opal-like" colonies.

Cell membrane structure
While L. pneumophila is categorized as a Gram-negative organism, it stains poorly due to its unique lipopolysaccharide content in the outer leaflet of the outer cell membrane. The bases for the somatic antigen specificity of this organism are located on the side chains of its cell wall. The chemical composition of these side chains both with respect to components and arrangement of the different sugars, determines the nature of the somatic or O-antigenic determinants, which are important means of serologically classifying many Gram-negative bacteria. At least 35 different serovars of L. pneumophila have been described, as well as several other species being subdivided into a number of serovars.

Detection

Sera have been used both for slide agglutination studies and for direct detection of bacteria in tissues using immunofluorescence via fluorescent-labelled antibody. Specific antibody in patients can be determined by the indirect fluorescent antibody test. ELISA and microagglutination tests have also been successfully applied.

Legionella stains poorly with Gram stain, stains positive with silver, and is cultured on charcoal yeast extract with iron and cysteine.

Ecology and reservoirs

L. pneumophila is a facultative intracellular parasite that can invade and replicate inside amoebae in the environment, especially species of the genera Acanthamoeba and Naegleria, which can thus serve as a reservoir for L. pneumophila. These hosts also provide protection from environmental stresses, such as chlorination. Legionella has been shown to proliferate on the walls of pipes in biofilms. Sloughed legionella from biofilms in plumbing systems can be aerosolized through faucets, showers, sprinklers, and other fixtures which can lead to infection after prolonged exposure.

Frequency of occurrence
In the United States, approximately 3 infections with L. pneumophila appear per 100,000 people per year. The infections peak in the summer. Within endemic regions, about 4% to 5% of pneumonia cases are caused by L. pneumophila.

Pathogenesis
In humans, L. pneumophila invades and replicates inside macrophages. The internalization of the bacteria can be enhanced by the presence of antibody and complement, but is not absolutely required. Internalization of the bacteria appears to occur through phagocytosis. However, L. pneumophila is also capable of infecting non-phagocytic cells through an unknown mechanism. A rare form of phagocytosis known as coiling phagocytosis has been described for L. pneumophila, but this is not dependent on the Dot/Icm (intracellular multiplication/defect in organelle trafficking genes) bacterial secretion system and has been observed for other pathogens. Once internalized, the bacteria surround themselves in a membrane-bound vacuole that does not fuse with lysosomes that would otherwise degrade the bacteria. In this protected compartment, the bacteria multiply.

Dot/Icm type IV secretion system and effector proteins
The bacteria use a type IVB secretion system known as Dot/Icm to inject effector proteins into the host. These effectors are involved in increasing the bacteria's ability to survive inside the host cell. L. pneumophila encodes for over 330 "effector" proteins, which are secreted by the Dot/Icm translocation system to interfere with host cell processes to aid bacterial survival. It has been predicted that the genus Legionella encodes more than 10,000 and possibly up to ~18,000 effectors that have a high probability to be secreted into their host cells.

One key way in which L. pneumophila uses its effector proteins is to interfere with fusion of the Legionella-containing vacuole with the host's endosomes, and thus protect against lysis. Knock-out studies of Dot/Icm translocated effectors indicate that they are vital for the intracellular survival of the bacterium, but many individual effector proteins are thought to function redundantly, in that single-effector knock-outs rarely impede intracellular survival. This high number of translocated effector proteins and their redundancy is likely a result of the bacterium having evolved in many different protozoan hosts.

Legionella-containing vacuole

For Legionella to survive within macrophages and protozoa, it must create a specialized compartment known as the Legionella-containing vacuole (LCV). Through the action of the Dot/Icm secretion system, the bacteria are able to prevent degradation by the normal endosomal trafficking pathway and instead replicate. Shortly after internalization, the bacteria specifically recruit endoplasmic reticulum-derived vesicles and mitochondria to the LCV while preventing the recruitment of endosomal markers such as Rab5a and Rab7a. Formation and maintenance of the vacuoles are crucial for pathogenesis; bacteria lacking the Dot/Icm secretion system are not pathogenic and cannot replicate within cells, while deletion of the Dot/Icm effector SdhA results in destabilization of the vacuolar membrane and no bacterial replication.

Nutrient acquisition
Legionella is  auxotrophic for seven amino acids: cysteine, leucine, methionine, valine, threonine, isoleucine, and arginine. Once inside the host cell, Legionella needs nutrients to grow and reproduce. Inside the vacuole, nutrient availability is low; the high demand of amino acids is not covered by the transport of free amino acids found in the host cytoplasm. To improve the availability of amino acids, the parasite promotes the host mechanisms of proteasomal degradation. This generates an excess of free amino acids in the cytoplasm of L. pneumophila-infected cells that can be used for intravacuolar proliferation of the parasite.

To obtain amino acids, L. pneumophila uses the AnkB F-Box effector, which is farnesylated by the activity of three host enzymes localized in the membrane of the LCV: farnesyltransferase, Ras-converting enzyme-1 protease, and ICMT. Farnesylation allows AnkB to get anchored into the cytoplasmic side of the vacuole.

Once AnkB is anchored into the LCV membrane, it interacts with the SCF1 ubiquitin ligase complex and functions as a platform for the docking of K48-linked polyubiquitinated proteins to the LCV.

The K48-linked polyubiquitination is a marker for proteasomal degradation that releases two- to 24-amino-acid-long peptides, which are quickly degraded to amino acids by various oligopeptidases and aminopeptidases present in the cytoplasm. Amino acids are imported into the LCV through various amino acid transporters such as the neutral amino acid transporter B(0).

The amino acids are the primary carbon and energy source of L. pneumophila, that have almost 12 classes of ABC-transporters, amino acid permeases, and many proteases, to exploit it. The imported amino acids are used by L. pneumophila to generate energy through the TCA cycle (Krebs cycle) and as sources of carbon and nitrogen.

However, promotion of proteasomal degradation for the obtention of amino acids may not be the only virulence strategy to obtain carbon and energy sources from the host. Type II–secreted degradative enzymes may provide an additional strategy to generate carbon and energy sources.

Genomics

The determination and publication of the complete genome sequences of three clinical L. pneumophila isolates in 2004 paved the way for the understanding of the molecular biology of L. pneumophila in particular and Legionella in general. In-depth comparative genome analysis using DNA arrays to study the gene content of 180 Legionella strains revealed high genome plasticity and frequent horizontal gene transfer. Further insight in the L. pneumophila lifecycle was gained by investigating the gene expression profile of L. pneumophila in Acanthamoeba castellanii, its natural host. L. pneumophila exhibits a biphasic lifecycle and defines transmissive and replicative traits according to gene expression profiles.

Genetic transformation
Transformation is a bacterial adaptation involving the transfer of DNA from one bacterium to another through the surrounding liquid medium. Transformation is a bacterial form of sexual reproduction. In order for a bacterium to bind, take up, and recombine exogenous DNA into its chromosome, it must enter a special physiological state referred to as "competence".

To determine which molecules may induce competence in L. pneumophila, 64 toxic molecules were tested. Only six of these molecules, all DNA-damaging agents, caused strong induction of competence. These were mitomycin C (which introduces DNA inter-strand crosslinks), norfloxacin, ofloxacin, and nalidixic acid (inhibitors of DNA gyrase that cause double-strand breaks), bicyclomycin (causes double-strand breaks), and hydroxyurea (causes oxidation of DNA bases). These results suggest that competence for transformation in L. pneumophilia evolved as a response to DNA damage. Perhaps induction of competence provides a survival advantage in a natural host, as occurs with other pathogenic bacteria.

Drug Targets 
Several enzymes in the bacteria have been proposed as tentative drug targets. For example, enzymes in the iron uptake pathway have been suggested as important drug targets. Further, a cN-II class of IMP/GMP specific 5´-nucleotidase which has been extensively characterized kinetically. The tetrameric enzyme shows aspects of positive homotropic cooperativity, substrate activation and presents a unique allosteric site that can be targeted to design effective drugs against the enzyme and thus, the organism. Moreover, the enzyme is distinct than its human counterpart making it an attractive target for drug development.

Treatment
Macrolides (azithromycin or clarithromycin) or fluoroquinolones (levofloxacin or moxifloxacin) are the standard treatment for Legionella pneumonia in humans, with levofloxacin being considered first line with increasing resistance to azithromycin. Two studies support superiority of levofloxacin over macrolides, although not FDA approved.

References

External links 
Major topic "Legionella pneumophila": free-full text articles in PubMed
Legionella pneumophila, causative agent of Legionnaire's disease and Pontiac fever at MetaPathogen
Type strain of Legionella pneumophila at BacDive -  the Bacterial Diversity Metadatabase

Legionellales
Gram-negative bacteria
Bacteria described in 1979